Vassilis Charalampopoulos (born 1970) is a Greek actor. He has played in numerous successful films, such as the film Bang Bank or the TV series Eisai to Tairi mou, Englimata and To Deka. He has won a Greek State Film Award for the film Pente Lepta Akoma and one television award for the TV Series To Deka. He has also won one theatrical award for the play The Frogs of Aristophanes that was presented in 2003.

Biography
Vassilis Charalampopoulos was born on 20 September 1970, in Athens. He graduated from the Dramatic School of Athens Odeon in 1992. He appeared in his first TV series in 1992. His first great success was his role in the comedy Englimata and subsequently the comedy Eisai to Tairi mou. Later he had leading parts in comedy films such as Bank Bang and Pente Lepta Akoma. He has won one cinema award for the film Pente Lepta Akoma.  Also has won one television award for his role in the TV Series To Deka and one Theatre award.

Selected filmography

Movies
Email (2000)
R20 2004
Loafing and Camouflage: Sirens in the Aegean 2005
Pente Lepta Akoma 2006
Bank Bang 2008
Pethaino Gia Sena 2009

TV Series
Eglimata (1998-1999)
Eisai to Tairi mou (2000-2001)
The 10 (2007-2008)
Me lene Vangeli (2011)

Cinema awards

Filmography

Television

References

External links

20th-century Greek male actors
21st-century Greek male actors
1970 births
Living people
Male actors from Athens